Tara Air Flight 197 was a scheduled domestic flight operated by Tara Air for parent company Yeti Airlines from Pokhara Airport to Jomsom Airport in Nepal. On 29 May 2022, the Twin Otter aircraft carrying 22 people (19 passengers and 3 crew members) departed at 09:55 NPT (04:10 UTC) and lost contact with air traffic controllers about 12 minutes later at 10:07 (04:22). The wreckage was located 20 hours later on a mountainside. All 22 passengers and crew were killed, and all 22 bodies were recovered. This was Tara Air's second deadly accident on this route, after Flight 193 in 2016.

Accident
The aircraft took off from Pokhara at 9:55 am local time and was scheduled to land at Jomsom Airport 10:15 am. According to the Civil Aviation Authority of Nepal (CAAN), it lost contact with air traffic controllers at 10:07 am, above Ghorepani, Myagdi District.

Aircraft

According to Flightradar24, the plane was a de Havilland Canada DHC-6 Twin Otter registered under the number 9N-AET. It made its maiden flight in April 1979.

Victims
The flight was carrying 22 occupants, and the 19 passengers consisted of 13 Nepalis, four Indians and two Germans. There were two pilots and a flight attendant among the 13 Nepalis on the flight. NDTV stated that the four Indian passengers were members of the same family from Mumbai.

Emergency response
Search efforts were initially hampered by poor weather conditions. The CAAN said that a search helicopter from Jomsom had to make a return trip due to the weather. Search efforts were also conducted by Kailash Air, but failed to locate the aircraft. The phone location of the captain was tracked by search and rescue personnel with the assistance of Nepal Telecom. A spokesperson from Yeti Airlines said that the tracking data indicated the phone's last location was around the vicinity of Lete, a village in the Mustang District. The CAAN said that an emergency locator transmitter narrowed the possible last known location to around the Khaibang area.

Locals from Lete informed police of an "unusual sound" near the village. A police officer said that the police would send a helicopter to the area. Air traffic controllers at Jomsom Airport also reported hearing a loud noise at around the time of the disappearance.

Five hours after it was reported missing, the wreckage of the plane was found near Kowang, a village in the Mustang District. Residents reported seeing the burning aircraft at the foot of Mount Manapathi, near the mouth of a river. An official of the Nepali Army said that personnel were traveling to the crash site. Search and rescue efforts were called off later that day due to snowfall at the suspected crash site. A Nepali Army brigadier general tweeted that the "loss of daylight and adverse weather" led to search and rescue being called off. Search and rescue was expected to resume the following morning.

On 30 May, about 20 hours after it was reported missing, the wreckage of the aircraft was located by local farmers in Sanosware, Thasang Rural Municipality in the Mustang District. No survivors among the flight's 22 occupants were found. According to Tara Air, 14 bodies were recovered from within a  radius of the crash site. The flight recorder ("black box") was recovered. A photograph of the crash site showed intact portions of the tail and a wing.

Reactions
The Indian embassy in Nepal tweeted about the disappearance shortly after it was reported: "Tara Air flight 9NAET that took off from Pokhara at 9:55 am today with 22 people onboard, including 4 Indians, has gone missing." Search and rescue operations were at that moment ongoing. The embassy was in contact with their families.

Cause
Initial findings have suggested bad weather was to blame for the crash.

See also
 List of airplane accidents in Nepal

References

2022 in Nepal
2022 disasters in Nepal
May 2022 events in Asia
Aviation accidents and incidents in 2022
Aviation accidents and incidents in Nepal
Accidents and incidents involving the de Havilland Canada DHC-6 Twin Otter
Mustang District
Tara Air accidents and incidents